The Home Credit Arena is an indoor sporting arena located in Liberec, Czech Republic. The capacity of the arena is 9,000 people and it was built in 2005. It is currently home to the HC Bílí Tygři Liberec ice hockey team.

It hosted matches from Group B and the Relegation Round at the 2008 World Junior Ice Hockey Championships. It is also a venue for home games of Polish basketball team Turów Zgorzelec in the Eurocup and Euroleague.

In its first five years of operation, the Arena welcomed 1.4 million visitors and hosted 467 events.

See also
 List of indoor arenas in the Czech Republic

References

External links 

  

Indoor ice hockey venues in the Czech Republic
Sport in Liberec
Sports venues in the Liberec Region
Buildings and structures in Liberec
2005 establishments in the Czech Republic
Sports venues completed in 2005
21st-century architecture in the Czech Republic